Thomas Evans or Tom Evans may refer to:

Sportsmen
Tom Evans (baseball) (born 1974), major league baseball player
Thomas Evans (cricketer) (1852–1916), English cricketer
Thomas Evans (footballer, born 1872), English footballer
Tom Evans (footballer, born 1896) (1896–after 1926), English-born football wing half for Birmingham and Brighton & Hove Albion
Tom Evans (footballer, born 1903), Welsh international footballer
Tom Evans (footballer, born 1907) (1907–1993), Welsh footballer for Tottenham Hotspur
Tom Evans (footballer, born 1976) (born 1976), English-born Northern Ireland footballer for Scunthorpe United and York City
Tom Evans (rugby union) (1882–1955), Welsh international rugby player
Tom Evans (runner) (born 1992), British long-distance runner
Thom Evans (born 1985), Scottish international rugby player

Military
Thomas Evans (British Army officer) (1776–1863), British-Canadian Army General
Thomas Evans (Medal of Honor) (1824–1866), recipient of the Medal of Honor

Politicians
Thomas Evans (Virginia politician) (c. 1755–1815), American politician, U.S. Congressman from Virginia
Thomas B. Evans Jr. (born 1931), former U.S. Congressman from Delaware
T. Cooper Evans (Thomas Cooper Evans, 1924–2005), former U.S. Congressman from Iowa
Thomas Evans (Wisconsin politician) (1848–1919), Wisconsin State Assemblyman
Sir Thomas William Evans (1821–1892), High Sheriff of Derbyshire and MP
Thomas Glendwr Gardner Evans (b. 1936) mayor of Lower Hutt, New Zealand, see Glen Evans
Tom Evans (Victorian politician) (1917–2009), member of the Victorian Legislative Assembly
Tom Evans (Western Australian politician) (1929–1995), member of the Western Australian Legislative Assembly

Poets
Thomas Evans (poet, 1840–65) (1840–1865), Welsh poet
Thomas Evans (17th-century poet) (died 1633), English poet
Thomas Evans (Tomos Glyn Cothi) (1766–1833), Welsh poet

Religion 
Thomas Evans (archdeacon of Worcester) (fl. 1787–1817), Anglican priest
Thomas Evans (Dean of Montreal) (1845–1920), Anglican priest
Thomas Evans (archdeacon of Carmarthen) (1914–1982), Anglican priest
Eric Evans (priest, born 1928) (Thomas Eric Evans, 1928–1996), Dean of St Paul's

Others
Thomas Evans (bookseller) (1739–1803), Welsh bookseller in London
Thomas Evans (bookseller, 1742–1784), London bookseller
Thomas Evans (conspirator) (1763 – by 1831), English insurrectionist
Thomas Simpson Evans (1777–1818), English mathematician
Thomas W. Evans (1823–1897), American dentist
Thomas Mellon Evans (1910–1997), American financier
Tom Evans (musician) (1947–1983), member of the band Badfinger
Tommy Evans, Irish cyclist
 Thomas Evans, father of Alfie Evans
 Thomas Evans, Al Shabaab militant and subject of the 2015 documentary My Son the Jihadi